John Weckström (born 26 December 1980) is a Finnish retired professional football player.

References
Sources
Guardian Football
Citations

1980 births
Living people
Finnish footballers
FC Jokerit players
FC Honka players
FC Haka players
PK-35 Vantaa (men) players
Käpylän Pallo players
AC Allianssi players
Atlantis FC players
FF Jaro players
Veikkausliiga players
Ykkönen players
Kakkonen players
Association football midfielders
Footballers from Helsinki